Amit Lal is an American academic, a Robert M. Scharf 1977 Professor of Engineering at the Electrical and Computer Engineering Department at Cornell University and director of SonicMEMS laboratory.

He served as a Program Manager at DARPA in the Microsystems Technology Office (MTO), from 2005 to 2009. At DARPA he managed ten and started six new programs in the area of navigation, low-energy computation, bio-robotics, and atomic microsystems.

References

External links 
 https://www.ece.cornell.edu/
 http://sonicmems.ece.cornell.edu/

Cornell University faculty